Christian Coleman (born March 6, 1996) is an American professional track and field sprinter who competes in the 100 meters and 200 meters. He is the former world champion in the 100 meters. He was a double gold medallist at the World Championships in Athletics in 2019, winning gold medals in both the 100 m and 4 × 100-meter relay. He holds personal records of 9.76 seconds for the 100 m, which made him the 6th fastest all-time in the history of 100 metres event,  and 19.85 for the 200 m. Coleman is the world indoor record holder for the 60 meters with 6.34 seconds. He was IAAF Diamond League champion in 2018 and the world number one ranked runner in the 100 m for the 2017 and 2018 seasons.

Coleman represented the United States in the relay at the 2016 Summer Olympics, competing in the heats only. He was the gold medallist in the 60 m at the 2018 IAAF World Indoor Championships and is a two-time American national champion, having won the 60 m in 2018 and 100 m in 2019. Coleman competed collegiately for the Tennessee Volunteers and won five NCAA titles indoors and out, including American collegiate record performances in both the 100 m and 60 m.

On June 17, 2020, it was announced that Coleman was provisionally suspended from competition due to a missed drug test dating back to December 9, 2019. On October 27, it was announced that Coleman had been banned until May 13, 2022, missing the 2020 Summer Olympics. He later appealed the decision to the Court of Arbitration for Sports that reduced his suspension to a year, citing that he never tested positive for PEDs, but he would still miss the 2020 Summer Olympics.

Career
Born to Seth and Daphne Coleman in Atlanta, Georgia, Christian Coleman grew up with two sisters, Camryn and Cailyn. He came from a sporting family, as two of his cousins were letter-winners in college football and his older sister Camryn competed in track and field at Georgia Southern University. He took part in track from a young age, winning the long jump in his age category at the Amateur Athletic Union Championships in 2007.

He attended high school at Our Lady of Mercy Catholic High School in Fayetteville, Georgia and was part of his high school track team. In his senior year, he competed at the 2014 New Balance Nationals Outdoor and was a finalist in both the 100-meter dash and 200-meter dash. At the Georgia High School State Championships he won the 100 m, 200 m, long jump, and 4 × 100 m relay, as well as setting state high school records in the 100 m (10.38), 200 m (21.10), and the 4 × 100 m relay (41.88). In addition, he was an all-state high school football player as a defensive back and wide receiver. He ended 2014 with a 100 m best of 10.30 seconds. Coleman received the Fred R. Langley Athletic Scholarship and went on to attend the University of Tennessee.

College
At Tennessee, Coleman was the 60 meters champion and 200 meters runner up at the 2016 SEC Indoor Track and Field Championships. He then went on to win the 200 meters at the National Track and Field Indoor Championships and was 3rd in the 60 meters. He was the runner-up in both the 100 meters and 200 meters dash at the 2016 NCAA Division I Outdoor Track and Field Championships.

After coming off an outstanding sophomore season, one that ended in making the 2016 Olympic team, he continued his success into his Junior season at Tennessee. During his indoor campaign he set PRs throughout the season resulting in world leading times in the 60 meters and 200 meters dash. Coleman took gold in both events at the 2017 Indoor National Track and Field Championships in historic fashion. He ran 6.45 seconds in the 60 meters, tying the collegiate record, and 20.11 seconds in the 200 meters, just 0.01 seconds off the collegiate record held by Wallace Spearmon. Christian finished his collegiate career by winning the 100 meters dash in 10.04 seconds and the 200 meters in 20.25 seconds at the 2017 NCAA Division I Outdoor Track and Field Championships. Coleman joins former Tennessee sprinter, Justin Gatlin, as the only other person to sweep the 60 meters and 200 meters indoor titles, and the 100 meters and 200 meters outdoor titles.

Coleman received some notoriety after the 2017 NFL Draft scouting combine.  John Ross set a new combine record of 4.22 seconds in the 40-yard dash and claimed he was faster than Olympic champion sprinter Usain Bolt.  Coleman responded to this by running the 40 yards in 4.12 seconds on turf.

Coleman was Tennessee's first winner of The Bowerman in 2017, an award that honors collegiate track and field's most outstanding athlete of the year.

Professional
Coleman qualified for the 2016 Olympic Trials in both the 100 meters and 200 meters. In the 100 m semi-finals he broke the 10-second barrier for the first time, finishing in 9.95 seconds. He was a little slower in the final, however, placing sixth, which potentially qualified him for the  m relay team. On July 11, Coleman was named to the US  meters relay team. At the Olympics, Coleman ran the second leg for Team USA in the  meters relay qualifying as the team won their heat with a time of 37.65 seconds. The team that ran in the finals, without Coleman, was disqualified.

2017 would prove to be Coleman's big breakthrough on the international scene. After winning the 100 meters and the 200 meters at the NCAA Outdoor Championships, he turned pro; signing a contract with Nike. At the U.S. Championships in Sacramento, California; Coleman claimed second place in the 100 meters, running 9.98s, behind Justin Gatlin's 9.95s. Coleman also competed in the 200 meters, again finishing in second, behind Ameer Webb.

2017 World Championships
Coleman claimed silver in the 100 meters final, with a time of 9.94 seconds, behind Justin Gatlin and ahead of Usain Bolt in his final 100 meters race. He dropped out the 200 meter event, citing fatigue. He also ran the anchor leg for the US  meters relay team at the championships, finishing second with a time of 37.52 seconds, 0.05 seconds behind Great Britain.

2018
Coleman began his 2018 indoor season with a world record time of 6.37 seconds in the 60 meters at the Clemson Invitational in South Carolina, breaking Maurice Greene's near 20-year-old record by two one hundredths of a second. However, his time was not submitted for ratification as a world record by USA Track & Field due to the event neither providing for electronic starting blocks, which measure reaction times in preventing false starts, nor a zero gun (AKA zero control) test, which checks that the automatic clock-timing system start and capture sequence are properly recorded. But, one month later, on February 18, 2018, at the United States Indoor Championships in Albuquerque, New Mexico, Coleman clocked a world record time of 6.34 seconds in the 60 meters final, thus breaking Maurice Greene's previously held record.

He went on to win the 60 meters world indoor title at the IAAF World Indoor Championships in Birmingham, clocking a championship record (previously held by Maurice Greene) of 6.37 seconds. The time is also the fastest recorded indoor performance at sea level. It is his first gold medal at the major championships.

At the start of the Outdoor season, Coleman suffered several setbacks. He injured his hamstring in April while in training and lost his first two 100 meter races of the year. One at the Prefontaine Classic in a wind-aided 9.84, and the other at an IAAF Diamond League event in Rome in 10.06. Both losses were to his teammate Ronnie Baker, who finished in third behind him at the 2018 World Indoor Championships. After his loss to Baker in Rome, Coleman dropped out of additional races in order to heal from his injuries.

Coleman finally returned to the circuit in July, winning the 100m in Rabat, Morocco in 9.98s in a tight finish. In doing so, he defeated his U.S. teammates Baker, Noah Lyles, and Mike Rodgers, who had all run 9.8 in Coleman's absence. Despite this decent return to form, he suffered more hamstring trouble while preparing for the 100m at the London Müller Anniversary Games, and did not return to racing until mid-August. On 18 August, Coleman won the 100 meters in 9.94s in Birmingham, England, just beating home favorite Reece Prescod by 0.001 seconds.

At the 2018 Diamond League finals in Brussels, Belgium, Coleman clocked a blistering 9.79-second run into a  wind during the men's 100 meters final, improving his personal best by three hundredths of a second. This performance marked Coleman as the joint 7th fastest performer of all time (tied with Maurice Greene) in the history of the event, as well as winning him his first Diamond League trophy. The time was the fastest run over the previous three years.

2019
Coleman skipped the 2019 indoor season in order to be fully prepared for the long outdoor season ahead.

Coleman began his 2019 season with a quick 9.86s in the 100 meters at the IAAF Diamond League event in Shanghai, China. However, he was beaten on the line by compatriot Noah Lyles, who finished in the same time. He then won the 100 meters in Oslo, Norway in a world-leading 9.85. He ran his first 200-meter race in two years at the Golden Spike meet in Ostrava, Czech Republic, finishing second to Canada's Andre de Grasse in 19.97 seconds. Next, Coleman won the 100m at the Prefontaine Classic in 9.81 seconds, lowering his world lead and beating world champion Justin Gatlin, who finished second in a seasons best of 9.87.

In August 2019, the United States Anti-Doping Agency temporarily banned Coleman under anti-doping whereabouts rules, on the basis that he had missed three drug tests in a 12-month period. This would have resulted in a two-year ban excluding him from both the 2019 World Athletics Championships and the 2020 Tokyo Olympic Games. Coleman successfully appealed the decision on the basis that under the World Anti-Doping Agency's International Standard for Testing and Investigations, a first missed test should be backdated to the first day of that testing quarter (April 1, 2018 in Coleman's case). As Coleman's third whereabouts failure came on April 26, 2019, this meant he had missed two tests within any given 12-month period. The whereabouts failures, suspension, and subsequent successful appeal could have remained private but the news was leaked to the public prior to the World Championships.

On September 28, 2019, Coleman won the final of the men's 100m at the World Championships in Doha, Qatar setting a personal best time of 9.76 seconds. That time makes Coleman the sixth fastest man in history, as well as the third fastest American in history. He subsequently withdrew from the 200m at the same event, preventing him attempting a sprint double.

2020
In February, Coleman decided to compete at the U.S. Indoor Championships in Albuquerque on the 14th and 15th with the intent of breaking his world record in the 60 m. On the first day, he won his heat in a world-leading time of 6.48 s while slowing down before the finish line. On the second day he won his semi-final in a time of 6.51 s again slowing before the finish line, and then took the U.S. title a few hours later in a world-leading 6.37 s, equal his second fastest time in world history and 0.12 s ahead of second place Marvin Bracy.

On June 17, it was announced that Coleman was provisionally suspended from competition due to a further missed drug test dating back to December 9, 2019. On October 27, it was announced that Coleman had been banned until May 13, 2022, missing the 2020 Summer Olympics. He later appealed the decision to the Court of Arbitration for Sports.

2021
On April 16, Coleman's ban was reduced to 18 months on appeal, ending on November 13, 2021, meaning he would still miss the 2020 Olympics.

Statistics
Information from World Athletics profile or Track & Field Results Reporting System unless otherwise noted.

Personal bests

Seasonal bests

International competitions

National championships

Circuit wins
Diamond League (100 m)
Overall winner: 2018
Rabat: 2018
Birmingham: 2018
Brussels: 2018
Oslo: 2019
Stanford: 2019
World Indoor Tour (60 m)
Boston: 2018

See also
2018 in 100 metres
2019 in 100 metres
Men's 60 metres world record progression
List of World Championships in Athletics medalists (men)
List of IAAF World Indoor Championships medalists (men)
List of 100 metres national champions (men)
List of doping cases in athletics
100 metres at the World Championships in Athletics
4 × 100 metres relay at the World Championships in Athletics
United States at the 2017 World Championships in Athletics

Notes

References

External links

Official website

Videos
 via ESPN
Christian Coleman wins the men's 60 meters USATF Indoor Championships final in 6.34 seconds via USATF
Men's 60m | World Indoor Championships Birmingham 2018 on YouTube via World Athletics
 via Diamond League
Coleman wins the 100m | World Athletics Championships 2019 | Doha Moments on YouTube via World Athletics

1996 births
Living people
Track and field athletes from Atlanta
American male sprinters
Olympic track and field athletes of the United States
Athletes (track and field) at the 2016 Summer Olympics
World Athletics Championships athletes for the United States
World Athletics Championships medalists
World Athletics indoor record holders
United States collegiate record holders in athletics (track and field)
African-American male track and field athletes
Tennessee Volunteers men's track and field athletes
World Athletics Championships winners
World Athletics Indoor Championships winners
USA Indoor Track and Field Championships winners
USA Outdoor Track and Field Championships winners
Diamond League winners
21st-century African-American sportspeople